is a railway station in the city of Chiryū, Aichi, Japan, operated by Meitetsu.

Lines
Shigehara Station is served by the Meitetsu Mikawa Line and is 2.2 kilometers from the terminus of the line at Chiryū Station.

Station layout

The station has two opposed side platforms connected by a level crossing. The station is unattended.

Platforms

Adjacent stations

|-
!colspan=5|Nagoya Railroad

Station history
Shigehara Station was opened on April 6, 1923, as a station on the privately owned Mikawa Railway Company.  The Mikawa Railway Company was taken over by Meitetsu on June 1, 1941. A new station building was completed in 2005.

Passenger statistics
In fiscal 2017, the station was used by an average of 855 passengers daily (boarding passengers only).

Surrounding area
 site of Shigehara Castle

See also
 List of Railway Stations in Japan

References

External links

 Official web page 

Railway stations in Japan opened in 1923
Railway stations in Aichi Prefecture
Stations of Nagoya Railroad
Chiryū, Aichi